Prostitution is legal and regulated in Bangladesh. Prostitutes must register and state an affidavit stating that they are entering prostitution of their own free choice and that they are unable to find any other work. Bangladeshi prostitutes often suffer poor social conditions and are frequently socially degraded.

Policy and law
Prostitution is legal in Bangladesh, but the Bangladesh constitution provides that the "State shall endeavor to prevent gambling and prostitution." Various provisions of different laws prohibit child prostitution, forced prostitution, solicitation and the keeping of unlicensed brothels.

Vagrancy laws are sometimes used against prostitutes, and they were detained in shelters indefinitely. In 2000, the Bangladeshi High Court ruled that the detention of over 100 prostitutes arrested in brothel raids was unlawful, and that prostitution is a legal occupation.

There are periodic crackdowns by the police, particularly against hotels being used for prostitution.

Penal Code
 Section 290 - (Offence Affecting The Public Health, Safety, Convenience, Decency And Morals) Whoever commits a public nuisance in any case not otherwise punishable by this Code, shall be punished with fine.
 Section 364A – Whoever kidnaps or abducts any person under the age of ten in order that such a person may be or subjected to slavery or to the lust of any person shall be punished with death or with imprisonment for life or for rigorous imprisonment for a term which may extend to 14 years and may not be less than 7 years.
 Section 366A – Whoever, by any means whatsoever, induces any minor girl under the age of eighteen years to go from any place or to do any act with the intent that such a girl may be or knowing that it is likely that she will be forced or seduced to illicit intercourse with another person shall be punishable with imprisonment which may extend to 10 years and shall also be liable to fine.
 Section 373 – Whoever buys, hires or otherwise obtains possession of any person under the age of eighteen years with the intent that such person shall at any age be employed or used for the purpose of prostitution or illicit intercourse with any person or knowing it likely that such person will at any age be employed or used for such purpose with imprisonment of either description for a term which may extend 10 years and fine. Any prostitute or any person keeping or managing a brothel, who buys, hires or otherwise obtains possession of a female under the age of 18 years, shall until the contrary is proved, be presumed to have obtained possession of such female with the intent that she shall be used for the purpose of prostitution.

Prevention and Suppression of Human Trafficking Act
 Section 12 - If any person keeps or manages or assists or participates actively in the keeping or management of a brothel shall be deemed to have committed an offence and shall for the offence be punished with rigorous imprisonment for a term not exceeding five years but not less than three years and with a fine of not less than taka 20,000.
 Section 13 - If any person in any street or public place or from within any house or building, by words, gestures, or indecent personal exposure attracts the attention of any other person for the purpose of prostitution he shall be deemed to have committed and offence and shall for the offence, be punished with rigorous imprisonment for a term not exceeding three years or with a fine of not less than taka 20,000 or with both.

Extent
Local NGOs estimated in 2008 the total number of female prostitutes to be as many as 100,000. A 2016 UNAIDS estimate put the figure at 140,000.

There are 20 brothel-villages in the country. The largest is Daulatdia which has about 1,300 sex workers, it is one of the largest brothels in the world.

Child prostitution
Child prostitution is widespread and a serious problem. The majority of Bangladeshi prostituted children are based in brothels, with a smaller number of children exploited in hotel rooms, parks, railway and bus stations and rented flats.

The UN Children's Fund (UNICEF) estimated in 2004 that there were 10,000 underage girls used in commercial sexual exploitation in the country, but other estimates placed the figure as high as 29,000.

Many girls involved in child labour, such as working in factories and as domestic workers are raped or sexually exploited; these girls are highly stigmatised and many of them flee to escape such abuse, but often they find that survival sex is the only option open to them—once involved with prostitution they become even more marginalised.

More than 20,000 children are born and live in the 18 registered red-light areas of Bangladesh. Boys tend to become pimps once they grow up and girls continue in their mothers' profession. Most of these girls enter the profession before the age of 12.

Disabled children who live in institutions and children displaced as a result of natural disasters such as floods are highly susceptible to commercial sexual exploitation.

Girls are often sold by their families to brothels for a period of two to three years of bonded sex work. Visits to the brothels of Faridpur and Tangail in 2010 revealed that most sex workers there take or are made to take the steroid drug dexamethasone to gain weight and to look better.

The authorities generally ignore the minimum age of 18, often circumvented by false statements of age, for legal female prostitution; the government rarely prosecutes procurers of minors.

Sex trafficking

Bangladesh is a source, transit, and destination country for women and children subjected to sex trafficking.  Women and girls who migrate for domestic work are particularly vulnerable to abuse.

It is estimated by government sources and Border Security Forces that 50,000 Bangladeshi women and children aged between 12 and 30 are trafficked to India annually. Many of the girls end up in the red-light districts of Kolkata in West Bengal while others are sold to work in brothels, hotels and massage parlours across India in cities such as Delhi, Mumbai and Pune.

Some women who migrate through Bangladeshi recruitment agencies to Lebanon or Jordan for domestic work are sold and transported to Syria and subjected to sex trafficking. Some women and children are subjected to sex trafficking in India and Pakistan.

With nearly 700,000 Rohingya fleeing Burma for Bangladesh since August 2017, Bangladesh is host to more than 1 million undocumented Rohingya, including hundreds of thousands who fled Burma in previous decades. The Rohingya community's stateless status and inability to work legally increases their vulnerability to human trafficking. Rohingya women and girls are reportedly recruited from refugee camps for domestic work in private homes, guest houses, or hotels and are instead subjected to sex trafficking. Rohingya girls are also reportedly transported within Bangladesh to Chittagong and Dhaka and transnationally to Kathmandu and Kolkata and subjected to sex trafficking.

Unwed mothers, orphans, and others outside the normal family support system are the most vulnerable to human trafficking. Government corruption greatly facilitates the process of trafficking. Police and local government officials often ignore trafficking in women and children for commercial sexual exploitation and are easily bribed by brothel owners and pimps. Women and children are trafficked both internally and internationally. International criminal gangs conduct some of the trafficking; the border with India is loosely controlled, especially around Jessore and Benapole, which makes illegal border crossings easy.

Police estimate more than 15,000 women and children are smuggled out of Bangladesh every year. Bangladesh and Nepal are the main sources of trafficked children in South Asia. Bangladeshi women and girls are forced into the brothels of India, Pakistan, Malaysia, UAE and other Asian countries.

The United States Department of State Office to Monitor and Combat Trafficking in Persons ranks Bangladesh as a 'Tier 2 Watch List' country.

Methods and techniques of trafficking
The Constitution states that each individual is entitled to choose his/her own profession/occupation or trade. Taking advantage of the vulnerability of the poverty-stricken or opportunity seeking people, traffickers either coerce, entice, lure or sell minors and other gullible persons into prostitution. They make them execute affidavits in front of false magistrates/impersonators stating that they have gone into prostitution of their own volition and they are over 18 years old.
Forms of trafficking include fake marriages, sale by parents to "uncles" offering jobs, auctions to brothel owners or farmers, and abduction. Traffickers and procurers pose as prospective husbands to impoverished families. They take the girls away and sell them into prostitution. A large number of "brides" have been collected in this manner and brought as a group to Pakistan where they are handed over to local traffickers.

Coalition Against Trafficking in Women – Bangladesh, which comprises 40 organisations, is working on this issue.

HIV/AIDS

According to non-governmental organizations, prostitutes and their clients are most at risk from HIV due to ignorance and lack of public information about unprotected sex.

See also
Human trafficking in Bangladesh
Prostitution in Asia
Prostitution in Europe
Prostitution in the Americas 
Male prostitution in Bangladesh

References

Further reading
 
 
 Azim T, Khan SI, Haseen F, Huq NL, Henning L, Pervez MM, Chowdhury ME, Sarafian I. HIV and AIDS in Bangladesh. J Health Popul Nutr. 2008 Sep;26(3):311-24. . ; .
 Sultana H. Sex worker activism, feminist discourse and HIV in Bangladesh. Cult Health Sex. 2015;17(6):777-88. . Epub 2015 Jan 15. ; .
 Hengartner MP, Islam MN, Haker H, Rössler W. Mental Health and Functioning of Female Sex Workers in Chittagong, Bangladesh. Front Psychiatry. 2015 Dec 15;6:176. . ; .
 Alam N, Chowdhury ME, Mridha MK, Ahmed A, Reichenbach LJ, Streatfield PK, Azim T. Factors associated with condom use negotiation by female sex workers in Bangladesh. Int J STD AIDS. 2013 Oct;24(10):813-21. . Epub 2013 Jul 15. ; .
 Azim T, Chowdhury EI, Reza M, Ahmed M, Uddin MT, Khan R, Ahmed G, Rahman M, Khandakar I, Khan SI, Sack DA, Strathdee SA. Vulnerability to HIV infection among sex worker and non-sex worker female injecting drug users in Dhaka, Bangladesh: evidence from the baseline survey of a cohort study. Harm Reduct J. 2006 Nov 17;3:33. . ; .
 Wahed T, Alam A, Sultana S, Alam N, Somrongthong R. Sexual and reproductive health behaviors of female sex workers in Dhaka, Bangladesh. PLoS One. 2017 Apr 3;12(4):e0174540. . ; .
 Wilson E, Barnard S, Mahmood S, Nuccio O, Rathod SD, Chowdhury R, Sapkota S, Tabassum T, Rashid SH, Verde Hashim C. Experiences of a 'screen and treat' cervical cancer prevention programme among brothel-based female sex workers in Bangladesh: A qualitative interview study. Women's Health. 2021 Jan-Dec;17:17455065211047772. . ; .
 Nessa K, Waris SA, Sultan Z, Monira S, Hossain M, Nahar S, Rahman H, Alam M, Baatsen P, Rahman M. Epidemiology and etiology of sexually transmitted infection among hotel-based sex workers in Dhaka, Bangladesh. J Clin Microbiol. 2004 Feb;42(2):618-21. . ; .
 Alam N, Rahman M, Gausia K, Yunus MD, Islam N, Chaudhury P, Monira S, Funkhouser E, Vermund SH, Killewo J. Sexually transmitted infections and risk factors among truck stand workers in Dhaka, Bangladesh. Sex Transm Dis. 2007 Feb;34(2):99-103. . ; .

External links
South Asia Bangladesh prostitutes up in arms
Inside the slave trade
Prostitution in Bangladesh: An Empirical Profile of Sex Workers
Commercial Sex Workers In Urban Bangladesh

 
Law of Bangladesh
Society of Bangladesh